Jason Altom (6 October 1971 – 15 August 1998) was an American PhD student working in the research group of Nobel laureate Elias James Corey at Harvard University.  He killed himself by taking potassium cyanide in 1998, citing in his suicide note "abusive research supervisors" as one reason for taking his life. Altom was studying a complex natural product and felt enormous pressure to finish the molecule before starting his academic career.

Altom's suicide highlighted the pressures on PhD students, problems of isolation in graduate school, and sources of tension between graduate mentors and their students. His case prompted many US universities to insist that PhD students have an advisory committee in addition to a supervisor, to whom they might turn for support: James Anderson, who became Harvard Chemistry Department Chairman, stated that "Jason's death prompted an examination of the role the department should play in graduate students' lives". Anderson went on to promise that students will also have "confidential and seamless access" to psychological counselling services, paid for by the department. Harvard students currently have unlimited access to mental health services if seen by a psychologist or psychiatrist at University health services and up to 40 sessions of regular outside care with a copay as part of their continuing effort to provide access to mental health care.

The molecule whose synthesis Altom was attempting to complete, aspidophytine, was subsequently completed by postdoctoral research associates and published in the Journal of the American Chemical Society in 1999. The article was dedicated to Altom's memory.

See also
Cornell gorge suicides

References

1971 births
1998 deaths
1998 suicides
Suicides by cyanide poisoning
Suicides in Massachusetts
Harvard Graduate School of Arts and Sciences alumni